Matthew Taylor (born October 17, 1981) is an American soccer coach and former player who currently serves as an assistant coach for Real Salt Lake in Major League Soccer.

College career
Born in Columbus, Ohio, Taylor grew up in Irvine, California and played college soccer at UCLA from 2000 to 2003. Taylor was mostly a substitute his first year, but earned a larger role as a sophomore, finishing the season with seven goals and two assists. As a junior, he bettered that, registering 12 goals and eight assists, while being an important part of a UCLA team that won the NCAA Championship. Taylor's senior season was his best, as he scored 14 goals and had 8 assists, was named the Pac-10 Player of the Year, and was a Hermann Trophy finalist. Taylor was the nation's leading scorer in the NCAA tournament during UCLA's championship run in 2002 and was named to the all tournament team at the college cup. Taylor is also the all-time leading scorer for UCLA in post season tournament play. During his college years he played several games alongside former German National Team player Jürgen Klinsmann with Orange County Blue Star in the USL Premier Development League.

Professional career
An excellent MLS Combine saw the Kansas City Wizards trade up to draft him 4th overall in the 2004 MLS SuperDraft. Although stuck behind Davy Arnaud and Josh Wolff and receiving little playing time in 2003, Taylor showed his scoring acumen registering three goals and an assist in only 524 minutes from a substitute's role.

After his first season, Taylor was left unprotected for the 2004 MLS Expansion Draft, and was selected 8th overall by Chivas USA. He became one of the few non-Hispanics on the squad. Taylor was Chivas USA's first ever player to be named MLS player of the week. Taylor's first four years in MLS were hampered by injuries including a broken tibia, and double hernia surgery. Taylor became a first eleven player for Chivas USA coach Hans Westerhof and responded by leading all offensive categories in a starter's role. Taylor just started to regain the speed and quickness to match his work rate when he decided to leave Chivas USA over a contract dispute with then coach Preki. On July 25, 2007, Taylor signed for Portland Timbers.

He had a short stint at the amateur side Hollywood United in the Los Angeles-based USASA-affiliated Coast Soccer League, where he scored two goals on penalty kicks against his former club the Portland Timbers in the first round of the 2008 Lamar Hunt U.S. Open Cup, helping Hollywood to a shocking 3-2 win over the USL side.

On August 14, 2008, Taylor moved to TuS Koblenz, then playing in Germany's second tier 2. Fußball-Bundesliga just three days before their season started and scored in his first game for the team. On October 5, 2008, he scored a hat trick for Koblenz in a 5-0 win over Kaiserslautern. On May 27, 2009 Taylor signed a two-year contract with FSV Frankfurt, but left for 3. Liga club Rot Weiss Ahlen after playing only on year for FSV. Taylor moved to Preußen Münster for the 2012/13 3. Liga season after playing the 2011/12 season with SC Paderborn 07 in the 2. Bundesliga. Two years later he signed for 1. FC Saarbrücken.

Coaching career
After retiring in 2017, Taylor returned to his alma mater to become an assistant coach at UCLA. In 2021, he became an assistant coach for Major League Soccer club Real Salt Lake.

References

External links
Matthew Taylor at Kicker

1981 births
Living people
American expatriate soccer players
American expatriate soccer players in Germany
American soccer players
Hollywood United players
Orange County Blue Star players
Chivas USA players
Sporting Kansas City players
Sportspeople from Columbus, Ohio
UCLA Bruins men's soccer players
Portland Timbers (2001–2010) players
Major League Soccer players
USL First Division players
TuS Koblenz players
FSV Frankfurt players
Rot Weiss Ahlen players
SC Paderborn 07 players
SC Preußen Münster players
1. FC Saarbrücken players
2. Bundesliga players
3. Liga players
Regionalliga players
Soccer players from Columbus, Ohio
USL League Two players
Sporting Kansas City draft picks
Association football forwards
Real Salt Lake non-playing staff
UCLA Bruins men's soccer coaches
Sportspeople from Irvine, California
Soccer players from California